Bulo Bulo Airport  is an airstrip serving the town of Bulo Bulo in the Cochabamba Department of Bolivia.

See also 

Transport in Bolivia
List of airports in Bolivia

References

External links 
OpenStreetMap - Bulo Bulo
OurAirports - Bulo Bulo
Fallingrain - Bulo Bulo Airport
Bing Maps - Bulo Bulo

Airports in Cochabamba Department